Yang Hao (born 19 August 1983) is a Chinese professional footballer who currently plays for China League One club Shaanxi Chang'an Athletic as a central midfielder.

Club career
Yang Hao started his football career with Beijing Guoan after graduating from their youth academy during the 2001 league season. He would gradually establish himself within the following season at Beijing as an attacking midfielder who was also capable in playing as a striker. He however found it difficult to gain a continuous place within the starting eleven until the 2004 league season when he was able to play in 19 league games. His run within the squad was short lived after the introduction of Shen Xiangfu as the club's new manager at the beginning of the 2005 league season, which saw Yang's playing time severely limited. Only after the introduction of Lee Jang-Soo at the beginning of the 2007 league season did Yang start to become an integral member of the Beijing squad and when he started to settle within the team's midfield by the 2009 league season he would aid the team to the  league title.

In January 2011, Yang joined recently promoted side Guangzhou Evergrande on a free transfer. On 2 April 2011, he would make his debut for the club in a 1-0 win against Dalian Shide. Throughout the 2011 season, he saw the ambitious club go on to win the league title; however, Yang was not a regular for the club and he decided to join Guizhou Renhe before the 2012 season.

On 8 July 2014, Yang transferred to fellow Chinese Super League side Jiangsu Sainty. He made his debut for the club on 19 July 2014 in a 3-2 loss against Guangzhou R&F. He left Jiangsu at the end of 2016 season after his contract ended.

Yang signed for China League Two side Shaanxi Chang'an Athletic in July 2017.

International career
Yang would make his international debut against Iran in a friendly which the Chinese national team won 1-0 on 1 June 2009. He would play in several further friendlies and quickly became an integral member of the national team and even go on to score his first goal against Palestine in a 3-1 victory on 18 July 2009. Then Chinese manager Gao Hongbo would make sure that Yang would be a starter for all of China's vital games and included him in the squad that won the 2010 East Asian Football Championship before included him in the squad for the 2011 AFC Asian Cup.

Career statistics

Club statistics
Statistics accurate as of match played 31 December 2020.

International goals
Results list China's goal tally first.

Honours

Club
Beijing Guoan
Chinese Super League: 2009
Chinese FA Cup: 2003
Chinese Football Super Cup: 2003
Guangzhou Evergrande
Chinese Super League: 2011
Guizhou Renhe
 Chinese FA Cup: 2013
 Chinese FA Super Cup: 2014
Jiangsu Sainty
Chinese FA Cup: 2015

Individual
China PR national football team
 East Asian Football Championship: 2010

References

External links

Player Profile at Beijing Guoan website 

Player stats  at Sohu.com 

1983 births
Living people
Chinese footballers
Footballers from Beijing
Beijing Guoan F.C. players
Guangzhou F.C. players
Beijing Renhe F.C. players
Jiangsu F.C. players
Shaanxi Chang'an Athletic F.C. players
Chinese Super League players
China League One players
China League Two players
China international footballers
2011 AFC Asian Cup players
Association football midfielders